China competed at the 1996 Summer Paralympics, held in Atlanta, Georgia, United States.

Medalists

Athletes

Multi medallists
Medallists who have won more than two medals in the games.
 Yanjian Wu: 2 silver medals (Athletics - track)
 Hai Tao Sun: 3 gold medals (Athletics - field)
 Fuqun Luo: 2 gold medals and 1 bronze (Table tennis)
 Xiaoling Zhang: 2 gold medals and 1 bronze (Table tennis)

See also
China at the Paralympics
China at the 1996 Summer Olympics
Sports in China

References

External links
Atlanta 1996 Press Release - IPC
International Paralympic Committee
National Paralympic Committee of China (NPCC) - short introduction]

Nations at the 1996 Summer Paralympics
1996
Paralympics